Apinan Sukaphai (born August 21, 1983 in Chon Buri) is a track and field sprint athlete who competes internationally for Thailand.

Sukaphai represented Thailand at the 2008 Summer Olympics in Beijing. He competed at the 4x100 metres relay together with Siriroj Darasuriyong, Sompote Suwannarangsri and Sittichai Suwonprateep. In their qualification heat they placed fifth in a time of 39.40 seconds and they were eliminated.

References

1983 births
Living people
Apinan Sukaphai
Apinan Sukaphai
Apinan Sukaphai
Athletes (track and field) at the 2008 Summer Olympics
Apinan Sukaphai
Apinan Sukaphai